Atlantic Jaxx Recordings is a record company founded by dance music duo Basement Jaxx. Originally based in Camberwell and then Brixton, it was an outlet for releasing Basement Jaxx music. Its first release was "EP1" which was played by DJ Tony Humphries on New York Radio in 1994.

Artists include 
 Afrofiesta
 Gwyn Jay Allen
 Basement Jaxx 
 House Breakerz
 Moreno
 Phil Linton
 Sharlene Hector
 Snakeskin
 The Heartists
 Pinhead
 Dog Beats
 Ronnie Richards
 Yen Sung
 CL Gris
 Andrea Terrano 
 EYES
 Immortal Scientist 
 Celestial Being
 Geranimo & Mikey
 Planet Battagon
 Bigby
 Jack Nunn

See also 
 List of record labels

References

External links
 Official site

British independent record labels
House music record labels
Electronic music record labels